Nai Gaj Dam is an embankment dam currently under construction on the Gaj River in the gorge area at the edge of Kirthar Mountains range at about  north-west of Dadu city in Dadu District, Sindh Province of Pakistan. When complete, its power station will have a 4.2 MW installed capacity. Consultant supervision by Techno Consult International (TCI) from Karachi, Pakistan.

Construction
Construction of the dam started in May 2012. Initially planned to be completed in 3 years, the project has been heavily delayed, increasing its cost from an initial estimate of Rs17 Billion to a revised Rs 47.7 Billion in 2019. Around 51% of the construction work was completed as of 2018. The dam is now expected to be completed in 2024.

It is estimated that water will be supplied from Nai Gaj Dam to 28800 acres land in tehsil Johi and 300000 acres in other areas of Dadu District. Moreover, Nai Gaj Dam will supply 50 cusecs of water to the Lake Manchar for decreasing its pollution. Furthermore, the water will also be supplied from the dam to Kachho desert and area of Kohistan in Dadu District. PM Imran Khan vowed to complete the project and expressed concern over ineptitude of sindh government.https://www.dawn.com/news/1618684

Salient features
Type of Dam: Earth Core Rockfill dam.
Height of Dam: 194 Ft
Live Storage: 0.16 MAF
Gross Storage: 0.30 MAF
Dead Storage: 0.140 MAF
Sedimentation Load: 0.45 acre-feet / sq. mile
Fuse Plug Capacity: 74000 Cusecs
Spillway Capacity: 253000 Cusecs
Command Area: 40,000 Acres
Cropped Area: 80,000 Acres
Cropping Intensity: 200%
Power House Installed Capacity: 4.2 MW
Project Cost (2009): Rs.28.153 Billion (Revised)
EIRR: 13.18%
B.C. Ratio: 1.32:1

See also 

 List of dams and reservoirs in Pakistan
 List of power stations in Pakistan
 Nai Gaj

References 

Dams in Sindh
Hydroelectric power stations in Pakistan
Dadu District
Proposed hydroelectric power stations
Proposed renewable energy power stations in Pakistan